The Société des douze (French) was scholarly and literary dining club in Brussels.

The first society 
Its precursor, the Société de littérature de Bruxelles founded on 10 January 1800, was deprecated by the government of the United Kingdom of the Netherlands and disappeared in 1823. Goswin de Stassart, Victor-Joseph de Jouy, Adolphe Quetelet, Frédéric de Reiffenberg, Eugène Van Bemmel, and the poet Philippe Lesbroussart [fr] were members of this society.

Some of its members continued to meet in the salon of Lesbroussart and founded in the same year (1823) the Société des douze.

Founding members
The founding members were:
Auguste Baron
Philippe Doncker [fr]
 Louis de Potter
 Auguste Drapiez
Louis Gruyer [fr]
Lucien Jottrand [fr]
Philippe Lesbroussart [fr]
Joseph-Denis Odevaere
 Adolphe Quetelet
Édouard Smits [fr]
 Jean-François Tielemans
 Sylvain Van de Weyer

Activities 
Since its inception, important personalities were members of the society. The secrecy surrounding it attracted suspicion from the Press and William I's government.

Dissolution 
This first Société des douze, founded during the reign of William I, ended around 1830, as the Belgian Revolution seemed imminent.

It was, however, revived in 1834 after Belgian independence.

The new society 
This second Société des douze was founded in 1834, in the same spirit of the first one, by the new generation who would bring it back to life. While the first society was primarily composed of scholars and intellectuals that were active in the opposition to the government of William I, the members of this new society were almost exclusively from the world of the magistrate and Supreme Court of Brussels.

The founding members 
 Van Damme 
 P. De Cuyper
 Delporte 
Vandevelde
François Joseph Verhaegen [fr]
 Jean-Baptiste Van Mons, 
 Théodore Van Mons, 
 Heernu. H. (or F. Heernu)
 Delporte 
 Van Parys
Louis Ranwet [fr]
 Augustus van Dievoet

Notes and references

Further reading 

 Georges Libry-Bagnano, Les crimes d'un honnête homme, Imprimerie H. P. De Swart, La Haye, 1832, p. 180 
 Adolphe Quetelet, Notice sur Philippe Lesbroussart, membre de l'Académie, 1855, p. 14
 Lucien Jottrand, Louis de Potter, Librairie polytechnique d'Auguste Decq, Bruxelles 1860.
 Eugène Van Bemmel, « Louis De Potter », in : Revue trimestrielle, volume 27, Bruxelles, juillet 1860, p. 36
 Alphonse Le Roy, Liber memoralis : L'Université de Liège depuis sa fondation, 1869, p. 410
 Édouard Mailly, Essai sur la vie et les ouvrages de Lambert-Adolphe-Jacques Quetelet, Annuaire de l'Académie royale de Belgique, 1875, p. 290, note 15
 Annales gastronomiques, bachiques et littéraires, « éditées pour le cinquantenaire de la Société des douze et imprimées par les soins du secrétaire [des XII] », 1884
 Édouard Mailly, La Société de Littérature de Bruxelles : 1800-1823, Bruxelles, Mémoires couronnés et autres mémoires de l'Académie royale de langue et de littérature française de Belgique, XLI, 1888
 Fritz Masoin, Histoire de la littérature française en Belgique, de 1815 à 1830, Bruxelles, 1902, p. 42 (liste de membres de la "Société des douze")
 Louis Verniers, Bruxelles esquisse historique, Bruxelles : Maison d'Édition A. De Boeck, 1941.
 Jules Garsou, Jules Anspach. Bourgmestre et transformateur de Bruxelles (1829-1879), Bruxelles, 1942, p. 99-100
 Gustave Charlier, Le mouvement romantique en Belgique (1815-1830), tome I, La bataille romantique, Mémoires de l'Académie royale de langue et de littérature française de Belgique, tome XVII, Bruxelles, 1948, p. 18-24
 Roland Mortier, Les sociétés littéraires, dans: Histoire illustrée des lettres françaises de Belgique, Bruxelles, La Renaissance du livre, 1948, p. 235-236
 Louis Verniers, Un millénaire d'histoire de Bruxelles, Bruxelles, 1965, p. 568
 Liliane Wellens-De Donder, « Lettre de A. Quetelet à Lecocq, secrétaire perpétuel de la Société de littérature de Bruxelles. Gand, le 27 février 1819 », dans: Adolphe Quetelet 1796-1974, exposition documentaire présentée à la Bibliothèque royale Albert Ier à l'occasion du centenaire de la mort d'Adolphe Quetelet, Bruxelles, Palais des Académies, 1974, p. 95
 Paul Delsemme, Les écrivains francs-maçons de Belgique, Bruxelles : Bibliothèques de l'ULB, 2004.
 Marie-Rose Thielemans, Goswin, baron de Stassart, 1780-1854, Politique et Franc-maçonnerie, Académie royale de Belgique, Classe des Lettres, Bruxelles, 2008, page 261.
 Nicolas de Potter et René Dalemans, Louis de Potter. Révolutionnaire belge de 1830, postface de Francis Balace, Bruxelles : Couleur livres, 2011, p. 28  ().

Learned societies of Belgium